LaserSoft Imaging AG is a software developer designing software such as SilverFast for scanners and large format printers.

History

1986 - 1990 

LaserSoft Imaging was founded in Spring 1986 by the physicist Karl-Heinz Zahorsky, the president of the company today. LaserSoft Imaging became an early adopter of color- and image processing on the Macintosh. It was the first company to distribute video digitizers, such as Pixelogic's 'ProViz' and Truvel's 'TrueScan', the first professional color scanner for the Macintosh, which was first shown at Hannover trade fair CeBIT in 1988, to which LaserSoft Imaging was invited by Apple Computer.

1990 - 2000 

Karl-Heinz Zahorsky published many articles about image processing in several professional journals.
In 1990 Hell Graphics, the world's leading drum scanner developer in Kiel, hired him as an independent consultant to keep up with the rapidly  proceeding desktop technologies. In 1991 LaserSoft Imaging became a registered GmbH and moved into a large Prepress house to help in setting up color reproduction on the desktop and to link Chromacom systems to Macintosh Computers.

With RipLink LaserSoft Imaging presented a system to link major prepress systems, like Hell, Scitex and Crosfield to Macintosh. The distribution of leafscanners started the chapter of high-end scanners on the desktop. LaserSoft Imaging consulted Leaf, Canon, Sony, Seiko and others regarding desktop high end color. LaserSoft Imaging also was involved in the development of the Photone Prepress, after the product had gone through its infant stages.
In 1994 LaserSoft Imaging started the development of SilverFast, which was first presented in its early stages at CeBIT 1995. Version 2.0 was demonstrated at CeBIT 1996, version 3.0 was released in December 1996, version 4.0 in 1998.
The second office opened in Sarasota, Florida in 1997.

2000 - 2010 

LaserSoft Imaging released SilverFast version 5.0 in 2000, version 6.0 in 2002, version 6.5 in 2006 ant the latest version 6.6 in 2008. LaserSoft Imaging changed the company into a public corporation (Aktiengesellschaft) in 2001; the founder is the sole shareholder.
Today, LaserSoft Imaging has implemented scan software for over 300 scanners for Mac OS 9, Mac OS X and Microsoft Windows 98, 2000, XP, Vista. In the beginning LaserSoft Imaging's software was mainly distributed in Germany, but now, SilverFast is distributed globally through distributors as well as world-wide bundle agreements with manufacturers such as Canon, HP, Seiko Epson, Cruse, Leica Camera AG, Microtek, Nikon, Pacific Image Electronics, Pentacon GmbH, PFU/Quato, Plustek, Samsung, and Umax.
The company also supports high-end scanners such as the Heidelberg (Linotype) Topaz, Tango, Nexscan, and Chromagraph (3300 and 3400). LaserSoft Imaging's SilverFast was awarded "best color management software of the year 2008" by the European Digital Press Association (EDP). The award was given for improving the dynamic range of most scanners with its Multi-Exposure feature and for automatic creation of ICC profiles. The Fogra came to a similar conclusion after testing LaserSoft Imaging's IT8 targets and SilverFast's colour management system in 2009 by attesting full conformity to the strict ISO norm 12641. The HDRi raw data format was also developed in 2009. By adding the RAW data of the infrared channel to the usual RAW data it contains any readable image information for later post processing.

Products 

The company's products can be classified in four different categories :
 SilverFast SE / SE Plus / Ai Studio (Scanner Software)
 SilverFast HDR / HDR Studio (64Bit / 48 Bit Image Processing Software)
 SilverFast Archive Suite / Archive Suite SE
 SilverFast PrintTao 8 (Software for large format printers)
 SRDx Photoshop Plug-in (Dust and Scratch Removal)

 LaserSoft Imaging is also manufacturing reflective and transparent IT8 Targets (ISO 12641-1), Advanced IT8 Targets (ISO 12641-2) since 2019.
 The Resolution Target (USAF 1951) is a tool to determine the maximum resolution of a particular scanner.

Literature 
 Taz Tally, Ph.D. SilverFast - The Official Guide. Sybex, 2003. 
 Taz Tally, Ph.D. SilverFast - Das offizielle Buch. Mitp-Verlag, 2004. 
 Sascha Steinhoff: Scanning negatives and slides : digitizing your photographic archive - Rocky Nook, 2007.

References 

Software companies of Germany
Privately held companies of Germany
Companies based in Kiel